Midway is an unincorporated community in Linn County, Iowa, United States.

References

Unincorporated communities in Linn County, Iowa
Unincorporated communities in Iowa